The 2022 Meistriliiga, also known as A. Le Coq Premium Liiga due to sponsorship reasons, was the 32nd season of the Meistriliiga, the top Estonian league for association football clubs since its establishment in 1992. The season started on 1 March 2022 and concluded on 12 November 2022.

Flora won their 14th Meistriliiga title with five games to spare.

Teams

Stadiums and locations

Personnel and kits

Managerial changes

League table

Results

First half of season

Second half of season

Relegation play-offs

Legion won 3–1 on aggregate.

Season statistics

Top scorers

Hat-tricks 

Notes
4 Player scored 4 goals(H) – Home team(A) – Away team

Awards

Monthly awards

Annual awards

References

External links 
Official website

Meistriliiga seasons
1
Estonia
Estonia